Yi Jae-gak (4 April 1874 - 11 May 1935) was a member of the Imperial house of the Korean Empire and an official of Korean Empire. After the annexation of Korea, he was ennobled as Marquess.

Life 
Yi Jae-gak was born in Seoul as a member of Jeonju Yi clan. His father, Yi Sung-ung, was grandson of Crown Prince Sado. Passing the Gwageo literary exam in 1891, Yi was posted to Seungjeongwon as a Ga Juseo.

On 16 November 1897, Yi was appointed as 3rd class member of the Junchuwon. On September 21 1899, Yi was ennobled as Uiyang Dojeong (義陽都正), and on 19 November 1899, Yi was ennobled as Prince Uiyang (義陽君). Being appointed as Special official of the Gungnaebu and Chik-imguan 4th class, Yi resided in the United Kingdom from 22 June 1902 to 2 July 1902. While in Britain, he participated in the Coronation of Edward VII. After visiting, he met Gojong of Korea and reported about his journey. He reported Gojong about the Niagara Falls, Red Sea, and Sri Lanka. After returning to Korea, Yi was appointed as the director of the Artillery in Ministry of Military, contributing to the modernization of the army. When Japan became the victor of the Russo-Japanese War, Yi was sent to Japan to celebrate the victory, and stayed in Japan for 1 month. He received Order of the Paulownia Flowers while in Japan. In March 1905, Yi received Order of the Plum Blossom for his diplomatic careers. On 24 April 1905, Yi was appointed as the first president of Korean Red Cross.

On 21 July 1906, Yi got removed from his office as the president of the Korean Red Cross. In January 1907, Yi was appointed as Special official of Gungnaebu. On 21 January 1907, Yi awarded Order of the Auspicious Stars. On 22 April 1907, he received the rank of Major General with Yun Taek-young and Yi Gi-hong. On 24 April 1907, he was again appointed as the president of the Korean Red Cross. Yi guarded Korean Emperor during his visit to Southern Korea. He got Order of the Golden Ruler on 27 August 1910.

After the annexation of Korea, Yi got the title of Marquess. In 1911, Yi got 168,000 Won from the Japanese Government for the merits of annexation. On 1 August 1912, Yi got decoration for colonization of Korea from the Japanese Government. He was part of the state funeral of Gojong of Korea. On 11 May 1935, Yi died in Keijiō.

Honours 

 Order of the Plum Blossom on 25 March 1905
 Order of the Auspicious Stars on 21 January 1907
 Order of the Golden Ruler on 27 August 1910

 Order of the Paulownia Flowers on 1 April 1905

References 

1874 births
1935 deaths
Recipients of the Order of the Plum Blossom
Korean collaborators with Imperial Japan
Officials of the Korean Empire
Imperial Korean military personnel
Major generals of Korean Empire
Jeonju Yi clan
Recipients of the Order of the Rising Sun with Paulownia Flowers
Joseon Kazoku
19th-century Korean people
20th-century Korean people